Virgil Earl Cheeves (February 12, 1901 – May 5, 1979) was a Major League Baseball pitcher who played for six seasons. Nicknamed "Chief", he played for the Chicago Cubs from 1920 to 1923, the Cleveland Indians in 1924, and the New York Giants in 1927.

External links

1901 births
1979 deaths
Major League Baseball pitchers
Cleveland Indians players
Chicago Cubs players
New York Giants (NL) players
Baseball players from Oklahoma
Sportspeople from Oklahoma City
Terrell Terrors players